2666 is the last novel by Roberto Bolaño, released in 2004. 2666 may also refer to:

 2-6-6-6, a Whyte notation classification of steam locomotive
 2666 Gramme, a minor planet
 2666 BC
 2666 AD/CE in the 27th century